Petropavlovka is a rural locality (a selo) in Petropavlovsky Selsoviet of Ivanovsky District, Amur Oblast, Russia. The population was 731 as of 2018. There are 10 streets.

Geography 
Petropavlovka is located 38 km northwest of Ivanovka (the district's administrative centre) by road. Bogorodskoye is the nearest rural locality.

References 

Rural localities in Ivanovsky District, Amur Oblast